Khumra are a Muslim community found mainly in the Rohilkhand region of Uttar Pradesh in India.  They are also known as Sangtarash and Hansiri. A few were also found in Panipat and Karnal in Haryana, most of whom are now found in Pakistan. They generally refer themselves as Khumra Shaikh. The community has been granted Other Backward Classes status in Uttar Pradesh.

Origin 
The community was traditionally associated with the manufacture of millstones  (chaki in Urdu), which they then peddled throughout North India and Punjab.  According to their traditions, they descend from the Muslim soldiers, who are said to have settled in India sometime at the start of Muslim rule in North India.

The Khumra speak Urdu, and the Khari boli dialect of Hindi. They are exclusively Sunni, and claim to be of Shaikh status. They are found mainly in Rohilkhand, in particular the districts of Bareilly, Bijnor, Moradabad and Rampur. The Khumra are largely an urban community, occupying their own distinct quarters. A small number of Khumra are found in the Awadh region of Uttar Pradesh, mainly in the districts of Hardoi, Unnao and Sitapur.

Present circumstances 

The community is endogamous, and consists of several biradaris, all whom inter-marry and are of equal status. Of the several biradaris, the main ones are the Bahmani, Ghori, Hataiwale, Quraishi, Multani, Nawabar, Pacchawi, Pathan, Siddiqi and Tayar. In theory, all the biradari members descend from a common ancestor. The biradari name is also used as there surnames. Their customs are similar to other Muslims artisan castes, and this includes the presence of a caste council, known as a biradari panchayat, which deals with intra community disputes and acts as an institution of social control. Historically, the panchayat was extremely powerful, but this is no longer the case.

The Khumra in India have now set up an India wide caste association, the All India Khumra Hansiri/ Sangtarash Biradari, which acts as pressure group and community welfare organization. Many Khumra are involved in the manufacture of fans and mats from date leaves, grinding of stones and flour milling. Others are employed as industrial labourers or agricultural workers. Only a very small number own land, and are cultivators. The community has been granted Other Backward Class status, which allows it to obtain the benefit of a number of Government of India affirmative action programmes.

The Khumra of Haryana were mainly weavers, with peddling being a subsidiary occupation. They had much in common with the Bhatra Sikhs, whom they competed with, especially in the canal colonies of the Punjab. Like other Muslim communities of Haryana, they were expelled at the time of partition, and ended up settling in Pakistani Punjab. They now been assimilated by the Ansaris, a much larger weaving caste.

See also
 Bisati

References

Social groups of Uttar Pradesh
Muslim communities of Uttar Pradesh
Muslim communities of India
Shaikh clans
Social groups of Punjab, Pakistan
Weaving communities of South Asia
Muslim communities of Pakistan